Commission v Germany (or Commission of the European Communities v Federal Republic of Germany) refers to several different cases heard by the European Court of Justice, which the European Commission brought against Germany for infringing European Union law. This includes breach of the Treaty on the Functioning of the European Union (TFEU), or a failure to implement European Union Directives:

In Commission v Germany (1987) Case 178/84, article 34 TFEU did not permit the German Beer Tax Act to limit the definition of "beer" to just products that contained only malted barley, hops, yeast, water.
In Commission v Germany (1988) Case 18/87, the ECJ established conditions for when a service charge is not regarded as a customs duty, namely (a) it doesn't exceed the cost of the service, (b) that service is obligatory and applied uniformly for all the goods concerned, (c) the service fulfils obligations prescribed by EU law, and (d) the service promotes the free movement of goods by eliminating obstacles from unilateral measures of inspection.
Commission v Germany (1999) C-152/98, on non-compliance with Article 7 of Directive 76/464 concerning the discharge of dangerous substances into water, holding that a "programme" within the meaning of Article 7 differs from the general and ad hoc water protection measures of Member States
Commission v Germany (2007) C-112/05, on freedom of capital, holding it was "disproportionate" to limit big shareholders' votes and for Lower Saxony to have a golden share, for the government's stated aim of protecting workers or minority shareholders.
Commission v Germany (2010) C-271/08 holding that a 'fair balance' should be achieved between social and economic rights.

See also
Commission v France (disambiguation)
Commission v Ireland (disambiguation)
Commission v Italy (disambiguation)
Commission v United Kingdom (disambiguation)

Court of Justice of the European Union case law